Eurybia hemispherica, commonly known as the southern prairie aster, is an herbaceous plant in the composite family (Asteraceae). It is native to the south-central United States, primarily the lower Mississippi Valley and southeastern Great Plains, from Kansas south to Texas and east to Kentucky, Tennessee, and the Florida Panhandle. 
Its natural habitat is typically in upland prairies or dry savannas. It is less commonly found in open moist areas, in sandy-loamy soil.

Eurybia hemispherica is a perennial, growing up to 120 cm tall. Its leaves are linear, glabrous, and somewhat shiny. It produces flowers in late summer and fall. The inflorescence is elongated, like a spike or raceme. Its heads have purple ray flowers.

References

External links
Photo of herbarium specimen at Missouri Botanical Garden, collected in Missouri in 2001

Flora of the United States
hemispherica
Plants described in 1933